Seán Conlan (born 1975) is a former Irish Independent politician, who formerly sat as a member of Fine Gael in Dáil Éireann. He was elected as a Teachta Dála (TD) for the Cavan–Monaghan constituency at the 2011 general election.

He lives in Ballybay, County Monaghan. A solicitor by profession, he was educated at St Macartan's College, Monaghan and at University College Dublin where he obtained an honours degree in economics. He is a son of John Conlan who was TD for Monaghan and Cavan–Monaghan, and also a Senator.

Conlan was elected to Ballybay Town Council at the 2009 local elections, topping the poll on his first attempt. In January 2011 he was added (with only four weeks left) to the Fine Gael ticket for the February general election.

Conlan was the subject of controversy when it was revealed by the Irish Independent that he had hired his girlfriend (a practicing barrister) for the position of his Dáil assistant in 2012. The position comes with an annual salary of €50,000.

In early September 2015 he was arrested under Section 4 of the Criminal Justice Act following a pub brawl on 23 August 2015. 
 
He resigned from Fine Gael on 24 November 2015 and contested the 2016 general election as an independent candidate.

Following his September 2015 arrest, he faced two charges under the Firearms and Offensive Weapons Act and another of assault causing harm. On 1 December 2015 he was remanded on bail, and due to appear before the Carrickmacross District Court in January 2016.

He lost his seat at the 2016 general election.

See also
Families in the Oireachtas

References

 

1975 births
Living people
Alumni of University College Dublin
Fine Gael TDs
Independent TDs
Irish solicitors
Local councillors in County Monaghan
Members of the 31st Dáil